"The Man from Nowhere" is the fifteenth episode of the 1969 ITC British television series Randall and Hopkirk (Deceased) starring Mike Pratt, Kenneth Cope and Annette Andre. The episode was first broadcast on 28 December 1969 on the ITV. It was directed by Robert Tronson.

Overview
In this episode Jeannie once again falls for the deception of another man, this time pretending to be Marty. Although she is extremely impressed with his knowledge that Marty once had as they visit Woburn Abbey, it is far more likely she is attracted to the man himself rather than truly believing he is Marty in spirit. However she is again used.

Cast
Mike Pratt as Jeff Randall
Kenneth Cope as Marty Hopkirk
Annette Andre as Jeannie Hopkirk
James Bree ....  Mullet, the Innkeeper
Ray Brooks ....  Marty/Sheldon
Michael Gwynn ....  Hyde Watson
Neil McCarthy ....  Griggs
Patrick Newell ....  Mannering

External links
https://web.archive.org/web/20070206224216/http://www.anorakzone.com/randall/old/index.html

Randall and Hopkirk (Deceased) episodes
1969 British television episodes